The 1972 Missouri gubernatorial election was held on November 7, 1972, and resulted in a victory for the Republican nominee, incumbent State Auditor of Missouri Kit Bond, over the Democratic nominee, Edward L. Dowd, and Nonpartisan Paul J. Leonard. Joseph P. Teasdale was a candidate for the Democratic Party nomination, before winning the nomination in the 1976 election, as was lieutenant governor William S. Morris, while Gene McNary was a candidate for the Republican nomination.

Results

References

Gubernatorial
1972
Missouri